Johannes Elias Goetzee (March 8, 1884 – August 26, 1935) was a Dutch race walker who competed in the 1908 Summer Olympics. Goetzee was born in Delfshaven and died in Rotterdam.

In 1908, he was eliminated in the first round of the 3500 metre walk competition as well as of the 10 mile walk event.

References

External links
Biography and Olympic stats at Sports Reference

1884 births
1935 deaths
Dutch male racewalkers
Olympic athletes of the Netherlands
Athletes (track and field) at the 1908 Summer Olympics
Athletes from Rotterdam
19th-century Dutch people
20th-century Dutch people